Alexander Hall (born September 21, 1998), known colloquially as "A Hall", is an American freestyle skier who competes internationally as a member of the US Freeskiing Slopestyle team.

Career
He competed in the 2017 FIS Freestyle World Ski Championships, the 2018 Winter Olympics and 2022 Winter Olympics. Hall won the gold medal in the men's slopestyle skiing event at the 2022 Games in Beijing. 

Hall currently rides for Spyder, Faction Skis, Panda Poles, and Monster Energy Drink. In 2019, Hall won his first gold medal at the X Games in the slopestyle event. At the X Games Aspen 2021, Hall received bronze in men's ski big air. Hall also won the Real Ski 2021 gold medal.

References

External links

1998 births
Living people
American male freestyle skiers
Freestyle skiers at the 2018 Winter Olympics
Freestyle skiers at the 2022 Winter Olympics
Medalists at the 2022 Winter Olympics
Olympic gold medalists for the United States in freestyle skiing
Freestyle skiers at the 2016 Winter Youth Olympics
Youth Olympic silver medalists for the United States
X Games athletes
Sportspeople from Fairbanks, Alaska